The ambiguous term bicycle rack or bike rack may refer to:
Bicycle carrier, a device attached to a vehicle (e.g., to a car or bus) to which bicycles can be mounted for transport
Bicycle parking rack, a stationary fixture to which a bicycle can be securely attached (typically using a bicycle lock) to prevent theft
Luggage carrier, a device attached to a bicycle to facilitate carrying loads